Salim Kerkar (born 4 August 1987) is a footballer who plays for Kuwaiti Division One club Burgan SC. Kerkar has previously played for Gueugnon, Calais, Rangers, Charlton Athletic, Beroe Stara Zagora and Vereya.

Club career
On 8 September 2006, Kerkar made his professional debut, starting for FC Gueugnon in a Ligue 2 game against Tours FC. On 5 May 2007, he signed his first professional contract with Gueugnon.

On 17 August 2010, Kerkar went on trial with Scottish Premier League side Rangers, scoring a goal in a 5–0 friendly over Partick Thistle. On 28 October, Rangers boss Walter Smith announced that Kerkar was no longer a target as his old club FC Gueugnon were demanding up to €360,000 compensation. FC Gueugnon then retracted their demand for compensation and instead opted for a sell-on clause, allowing Kerkar to sign for the Ibrox club. He made his debut as a substitute in the 5-0 win against Motherwell at Fir Park on 30 April 2011. He scored his first goal for Rangers in the Scottish Cup against Arbroath on 8 January 2012, celebrating with a flute playing imitation in the mould of Gazza.

On 18 July 2012, Kerkar went on trial with English Championship side Charlton. He signed for Charlton on 1 August 2012. He was released by Charlton at the end of the 2012–13 season.

After seven months without club, Kerkar signed with Bulgarian side Beroe Stara Zagora on 13 February 2014.

On 20 October 2016, following a trial period, Kerkar signed a one-year contract with the other club from Stara Zagora Vereya.

International career
In 2014, Algeria's manager Christian Gourcuff announced that he wanted Salim to play for Algeria, due to his Algerian family background.

Personal life
Kerkar is the younger brother of former Algerian international footballer Karim Kerkar.

Honours
Rangers
Scottish Premier League (1): 2010–11
Scottish League Cup (1): 2011

References

External links
 
 

1987 births
Living people
People from Givors
Sportspeople from Lyon Metropolis
Association football midfielders
Association football wingers
Algerian footballers
French footballers
FC Gueugnon players
French sportspeople of Algerian descent
Ligue 2 players
Scottish Premier League players
English Football League players
First Professional Football League (Bulgaria) players
Calais RUFC players
Rangers F.C. players
Charlton Athletic F.C. players
PFC Beroe Stara Zagora players
FC Vereya players
French expatriate footballers
Expatriate footballers in Scotland
Algerian expatriates in the United Kingdom
Expatriate footballers in England
Expatriate footballers in Bulgaria
Footballers from Auvergne-Rhône-Alpes